London Society was a Victorian era illustrated monthly periodical, subtitled "an illustrated magazine of light and amusing literature for the hours of relaxation". It was published between 1862 and 1898 by W. Clowes and Sons, London, England. The magazine published miscellaneous articles, short fiction (mostly anonymous), and serialized novels. The Stanford Companion to Victorian Fiction called it "an inferior imitator of Smith's Cornhill".

Literary contributors included Charlotte Riddell, whose novels Above Suspicion (1874) and The Senior Partner (1881-2) were serialized; Florence Marryat (Open Sesame); and a pre-Sherlock Holmes Arthur Conan Doyle. Illustrators included Mary Ellen Edwards, Randolph Caldecott, Harry Furniss, F. A. Fraser, and George Cruikshank.

References

 Cooke, Simon. Illustrated Periodicals of the 1860s. Pinner, Middlesex: Private Libraries Association, 2010

External links

 London Society index at The Online Books Page of free digitised volumes

19th century in London
1862 establishments in the United Kingdom
1898 disestablishments in the United Kingdom
Monthly magazines published in the United Kingdom
Defunct literary magazines published in the United Kingdom
Magazines published in London
Magazines established in 1862
Magazines disestablished in 1898